"Irrésistiblement" is a song by Sylvie Vartan, released in 1968.

Writing and composition 
The song was written by Jean Renard and Georges Aber.

Commercial performance

France 
The song was at no. 13 in the very first edition of the singles sales chart launched by the Centre d'Information et de Documentation du Disque in October 1968.

Italy 
Sylvie Vartan also recorded a version of this song in Italian, titled "Irresistibilmente". It reached the top 3 in Italy in 1969. The song was a gift that Vartan gave to her couple, the italian composer Franco Battiato.

Track listings 
7-inch EP Baby Capone / Pas en été / Irrésistiblement / Je suis comme ça RCA 87071 (1968, France etc.)
A1. "Baby Capone" (3:23)
A2. "Pas en été" (2:47)
B1. "Irrésistiblement" (2:43)
B2. "Je suis comme ça" (2:43)

7-inch promo single RCA Victor 46.170 (1968, France)
 "Irrésistiblement" (2:50)
 "Je suis comme ça" (2:50)

7-inch single (Germany, Greece, Spain)
 "Irrésistiblement" (2:50)
 "Baby Capone' (3:30)7-inch EP Baby Capone / Irrésistiblement / C'est un jour à rester couché / Ballade pour une fugue RCA 87071''' (1969, Brazil)
A1. "C'est un jour à rester couché"
A2. "Baby Capone"
B1. "Irrésistiblement"
B2. "Ballade pour une fugue"

Charts

"Baby Capone" / "Irrésistiblement"

Cover versions 
The tune was recorded by the Grand Orchestre de Paul Mauriat.

References 

1968 songs
1968 singles
Sylvie Vartan songs
RCA Victor singles
Songs written by Jean Renard (songwriter)
Songs written by Georges Aber